Sinopliosaurus (meaning "Chinese more lizard"; in reference to Pliosaurus) is a genus of pliosauroid plesiosaur, a type of short-necked marine reptile, alive during the Aptian and Albian stages of the Early Cretaceous (disputed Sinopliosaurus remains have been dated to the Toarcian age and were found in the Ziliujing Formation) of the People's Republic of China - its exact age is unknown. The type species, Sinopliosaurus weiyuanensis, was named and described in 1944 by Yang Zhongjian.  One species, "S." fusuiensis, was later shown to be based on teeth from a spinosaurid theropod dinosaur which is now known as Siamosaurus. S. weiyuanensis would have lived near a coastal environment.

The holotype, IVPP V140, consists of three vertebrae and a tooth, discovered in a layer of the Lianmugin Formation (Tugulu Group).

See also
 List of plesiosaur genera
 Timeline of plesiosaur research

References

Plesiosaurs of Asia
Jurassic plesiosaurs
Jurassic reptiles of Asia
Early Cretaceous plesiosaurs
Fossil taxa described in 1942
Early Cretaceous reptiles of Asia
Albian genus extinctions
Taxa named by Yang Zhongjian
Sauropterygian genera